Spanish singer and songwriter Rosalía has received several awards and nominations, including two Grammy Awards, eight Latin Grammy Awards, four MTV Video Music Awards and a MTV Europe Music Award. In 2017, she released her first studio album Los Ángeles, which gave her a nomination for Best New Artist at the 18th Annual Latin Grammy Awards.

In 2018, she released her second album El Mal Querer to critical acclaim, the album won Best Latin Rock, Urban or Alternative Album at the 62nd Annual Grammy Awards, where she also was nominated for Best New Artist (being the first Spanish-language artist to be nominated for the award), while at the 20th Annual Latin Grammy Awards, the album won Best Contemporary Pop Vocal Album and Album of the Year, becoming the third solo female artist to win the latter in the history of the awards. Rosalía is the first, and to date only, artist to have been nominated for Best New Artist at both the Grammy Awards and Latin Grammy Awards. For "Malamente", the lead single of the album, she won Latin Grammys for Best Alternative Song and Best Urban Fusion/Performance in addition to nominations for both Song of the Year and Record of the Year.

In 2019, she released "Con Altura" alongside Colombian singer J Balvin and Spanish musician El Guincho, the song became a commercial success and received several awards including the Latin Grammy Award for Best Urban Song, the MTV Video Music Award for Best Latin and the MTV Europe Music Award for Best Collaboration. In 2020, she collaborated with Puerto Rican singer Ozuna in "Yo x Ti, Tu x Mi", the song won Best Urban Song and Best Urban Fusion/Performance at the 21st Annual Latin Grammy Awards, in the ceremony she also won Best Short Form Music Video for "TKN", her song with American rapper Travis Scott. In 2021, she released "LA FAMA" featuring Canadian singer The Weeknd. The following year, she released "SAOKO" as the first single of her third album, the song's video won Best Editing at the 2022 MTV Video Music Awards.

In 2022, she released her third album Motomami to critical acclaim as well as significant commercial success compared to her previous efforts. At the 23rd Annual Latin Grammy Awards, the album received nominations for Album of the Year and Best Alternative Music Album, while the track "Hentai" was nominated for Song of the Year, Best Alternative Song and Best Short Form Video.

Awards and nominations

Notes

References

Rosalía
Awards